Wyganów may refer to the following places:
Wyganów, Greater Poland Voivodeship (west-central Poland)
Wyganów, Łódź Voivodeship (central Poland)
Wyganów, West Pomeranian Voivodeship (north-west Poland)